Imperial Hotels Group is a hotel conglomerate, based in Uganda, with operations in  Kampala and Entebbe. The Group is privately owned, with substantial ownership in the hands of Karim Hirji, one of the wealthiest individuals in Uganda.

Overview
As of July 2014, the group consists of the following properties:

 Kampala, Uganda
 Imperial Royale Hotel 
 Grand Imperial Hotel
 Equatoria Shopping Mall

 Entebbe, Uganda
 Imperial Resort Beach Hotel
 Imperial Botanical Beach Hotel
 Imperial Golf View Hotel

See also

References

External links
 Imperial Hotels Group Homepage

Hotel chains in Uganda
Kampala District